Kaivi (also Anunu) is a Kainji language of Nigeria.

Religion
The Kaivi people are predominantly Christians.

References

East Kainji languages
Languages of Nigeria